Exaile is a cross-platform free and open-source audio player, tag editor and library organizer. It was originally conceived to be similar in style and functions to KDE's Amarok 1.4, but uses the GTK widget toolkit rather than Qt. It is written in Python and utilizes the GStreamer media framework.

Exaile incorporates many features from Amarok (and other media players) like automatic fetching of album art, handling of large libraries, lyrics fetching, Last.fm support, advanced tag editing, and optional iPod and MSC device support via plugins.

Compared to typical music players, Exaile is able to handle large music libraries without requiring a massive importing of all music files into its own organizational structure. To facilitate this, Exaile allows users to organize their music library in a wide variety of ways, such as by tags, group tags, smart playlists, genre, storage location, and more.

In addition, Exaile supports plugins that provide features such as ReplayGain support, an equalizer with presets, previewing tracks via a secondary soundcard, and Moodbar integration.

See also

 Quod Libet

References

Notes
 Review: Exaile Makes Playing Music Simple and Stress-Free, by LinuxInsider.com
 Review: Exaile Media Player, by linux.com

External links

 
 
 Exaile documentation

2009 software
Free audio software
Free media players
Linux media players
IPod software
Jukebox-style media players
Free software programmed in Python
Software that uses PyGObject
Software that uses GStreamer
Audio player software that uses GTK
Applications using D-Bus
Cross-platform free software
Tag editors for Linux